Milward Lee Simpson (November 12, 1897June 11, 1993) was an American politician who served as a U.S. Senator and as the 23rd Governor of Wyoming, the first born in the state. In 1985, he was inducted into the Hall of Great Westerners of the National Cowboy & Western Heritage Museum.

Life and career

Simpson was born in Jackson, Teton County, Wyoming, the son of Margaret Louise Burnett (maiden; 1874–1974) and W.L. "Billy" Simpson (né William Lee Simpson; 1868–1940). He attended public schools in Meeteetse and Cody. He graduated from Cody High School in 1916. In June 1917, at age , Simpson graduated from the Tome School for Boys in Port Deposit, Maryland. As one of fifteen graduates, he was awarded Best All-Round Athlete for his outstanding performance on the school's football, basketball, and baseball teams. Franklin D. Roosevelt, who at the time was Assistant Secretary of the Navy, was the Commencement Speaker.

During World War I, Simpson served as a second lieutenant in the infantry, United States Army.

Higher education 
After the war, he attended the University of Wyoming, and in 1921, earned an AB degree. While a student at UW, he was both an athlete and a member of the university's debate team. Simpson was in the same class as Edward Deming (1900–1993), credited for, among other things, launching the Total Quality Management movement. He was also in the same fraternity, Alpha Tau Omega, as Glenn Parker (1898–1989), whom he appointed to the Wyoming Supreme Court when he became Governor in 1955.

From 1921 to 1923 and from 1924 to 1925, he attended Harvard Law School, but did not graduate.

Career 
In 1924, while studying at Harvard, Simpson took over his father's law practice.  He was admitted to the Wyoming Bar Association in 1926 and practiced law in Cody until 1955 when he became governor of Wyoming.

Wyoming government and U.S. government 
Simpson served as a Republican member of the Wyoming House of Representatives for one two-year term, from 1926 to 1927. He was a member of the board of trustees of the University of Wyoming in 1939 and president of the board from 1943 to 1954. He was a member of the National Association of Governing Boards of State Universities and Allied Institutions and served as president of the body from 1952 to 1953.

Milward Simpson ran for the U.S. Senate against Joseph C. O'Mahoney in 1940, but was defeated 58.7% to 41.3%. Simpson was narrowly elected governor in November 1954. He defeated the Democrat William Jack, 56,275 (50.5 percent) to 55,163 (49.5 percent). Simpson was unseated after a single term in 1958, a heavily Democratic year nationally, after a single term in office by John J. Hickey of Rawlins in Carbon County, 55,070 (48.9 percent) to 52,488 (46.6 percent). He resumed his law practice in 1959.

Simpson won a special election on November 6, 1962, to the United States Senate to fill the vacancy caused by the death of Republican Senator-elect Edwin Keith Thomson in the term ending January 3, 1967; he was not a candidate for Senate reelection in 1966 but was succeeded by outgoing Governor Clifford Hansen of Jackson. Simpson lived in Cody until his death in 1993 at the age of 95.

Voting record and policies 
As governor, Simpson advocated for, and signed into law the Wyoming Civil Rights Act of 1957, a measure aimed at abolishing racial segregation in the state. However, as a U.S. Senator, Simpson was one of six Republicans – the others being Barry Goldwater of Arizona, Norris Cotton of New Hampshire, Bourke B. Hickenlooper of Iowa, Edwin Mechem of New Mexico, and John Tower of Texas – who voted against the Civil Rights Act of 1964. Simpson voted in favor of the Voting Rights Act of 1965.

Sports 
Simpson played football, basketball, and baseball for the University of Wyoming in 1917, 1919–1920, and 1920–1921. He has been chronicled as the first to simultaneously serve as captain of three intercollegiate sports at the University. In 1996, Simpson was inducted into the University of Wyoming Athletics Hall of Fame.

Around 1921 and 1924, Simpson played semi-professional baseball in Red Lodge, Montana, and Cody. One of his teammates was the subsequent Lieutenant Governor and Education Superintendent Bill Dodd of Louisiana. They became close friends.

Sports Illustrated ranks Simpson, as a multisport star, Wyoming's 28th Greatest Sports Figure of the 20th Century.

Family 
Simpson – on June 29, 1929, in Sheridan – married Lorna Helen Kooi (1900–1995). They had two sons, both of whom have the middle name "Kooi." The younger son, Alan K. Simpson, served in the Wyoming House from Park County from 1965 to 1977 and in the United States Senate as a Republican from 1979 to 1997. Alan Simpson was the Senate Republican Whip during the early 1990s. An older son, Peter K. Simpson, is a retired historian and administrator at the University of Wyoming, who served in the state House from 1981 to 1984 from Sheridan County, where he was then residing while serving as an administrator at Sheridan College. Milward Simpson's grandson (by way of Alan Simpson), Colin M. Simpson, is a former member of the Wyoming House from Cody, who lost a Republican primary for governor in 2010 to Matt Mead of Jackson, a grandson of Clifford Hansen.

Bibliography

Notes

References

    (2005);  (2005).
  
  
 

  ; .
 

 
 

  ; ; .

 
  
   (publication);  (article).
 Book reviewed:
 

  
  

  .
 

  LCCN .

  LCCN .

  
  ; ; .
 

  

   .

General references

  .

  Via Internet Archive (Kahle/Austin Foundation)  .
 
 
 
 
 
 
 
 
 

  via Internet Archive (Kahle/Austin Foundation). ; ; .
 
 

  ; .

  ; .

External links
 
 

1897 births
1993 deaths
Baseball players from Wyoming
Basketball players from Wyoming
American people of English descent
Wyoming lawyers
Republican Party governors of Wyoming
American people of Scottish descent
Harvard Law School alumni
Republican Party members of the Wyoming House of Representatives
People from Jackson, Wyoming
People from Cody, Wyoming
Republican Party United States senators from Wyoming
Wyoming Cowboys basketball players
Wyoming Cowboys football players
Players of American football from Wyoming
Military personnel from Wyoming
United States Army officers
United States Army personnel of World War I
20th-century American politicians
American men's basketball players
20th-century American lawyers
20th-century American Episcopalians